Lino Aquea (born 3 October 1962) is a Chilean former cyclist. He competed in the team pursuit event at the 1984 Summer Olympics.

References

External links
 

1962 births
Living people
Chilean male cyclists
Olympic cyclists of Chile
Cyclists at the 1984 Summer Olympics
Place of birth missing (living people)